Clyde Christensen (born January 28, 1956) is an American football coach, currently working as an Offensive Analyst at his alma mater, North Carolina. A decorated assistant coach, Christensen has experience coaching collegiately and in the NFL ranks. Before returning to Chapel Hill, Christensen most recently was the quarterbacks coach for the Tampa Bay Buccaneers, where he worked with legendary QB Tom Brady. He has also coached for the Indianapolis Colts, where he mentored and developed Peyton Manning and Andrew Luck. Christensen has been a part of two Super Bowl-winning teams, XLI with the Colts and LV with the Buccaneers.

Personal life
Christensen is married to Debbie Christensen. They have three daughters: Rachel, Rebecca, and Ruth. Christensen is a Christian.

References

External links
Indianapolis Colts bio

1956 births
Living people
American football quarterbacks
North Carolina Tar Heels football players
Ole Miss Rebels football coaches
East Tennessee State Buccaneers football coaches
Temple Owls football coaches
South Carolina Gamecocks football coaches
Maryland Terrapins football coaches
Clemson Tigers football coaches
Tampa Bay Buccaneers coaches
Indianapolis Colts coaches
Miami Dolphins coaches
National Football League offensive coordinators